WUFQ (88.5 FM) is a radio station broadcasting a classical music format. Licensed to Cross City, Florida, United States, the station is currently licensed to the University of Florida Board of Trustees, and simulcasts WUFT Classic, the HD2 channel of WUFT-FM from Gainesville, Florida.

The station was established in 2009 as WWLC, a replacement station for WBVM's Lecanto satellite, WLMS 88.3 FM, which, like WBVM, was owned by the neighboring Roman Catholic Diocese of Saint Petersburg. WLMS was acquired in late 2008 by the Central Florida Educational Foundation and was closed down, to enable like-minded Orlando station WPOZ (also on 88.3 FM) to increase its power.

Effective July 26, 2019, the Roman Catholic Diocese of St. Augustine donated the station's license to the University of Florida.

References

External links

UFQ
Classical music radio stations in the United States
Radio stations established in 2006
2006 establishments in Florida
University of Florida